Ricardo Pérez (born 15 June 1991) is a Mexican professional boxer who has been ranked in the mini flyweight and light flyweight world #10 by the WBC.

Professional career

Pérez has won the WBC Silver titles at both mini flyweight and light flyweight, defeating Carlos Ortega and Noe Medina.

Professional boxing record

External links

1991 births
Living people
Mini-flyweight boxers
Light-flyweight boxers
Mexican male boxers
Boxers from Quintana Roo
People from Cancún